Oxenhall is a village and civil parish  north west of Gloucester, in the Forest of Dean district, in the county of Gloucestershire, England. In 2011 the parish had a population of 243. The parish touches Dymock, Gorsley and Kilcot, Kempley, Newent and Upton Bishop. Oxenhall has a parish meeting.

Landmarks 
There are 18 listed buildings in Oxenhall. Oxenhall has a church called St Anne's Church and a parish hall.

History 
The name "Oxenhall" means 'Nook of land where oxen are kept'. Oxenhall was recorded in the Domesday Book as Horsenehal. On 25 March 1883 a detached part of Pauntley parish was transferred to Oxenhall.

References 

Villages in Gloucestershire
Civil parishes in Gloucestershire
Forest of Dean